Brigadier General Kazimierz Gilarski (7 May 1955 in Rudołowice – 10 April 2010 in Smolensk) was a Polish military figure and Commander of the Warsaw Garrison. He was among the passengers killed in the 2010 Polish Air Force Tu-154 crash.

Honours and awards
He was awarded several top Polish civil and military awards:
Commander's Cross of the Order of Polonia Restituta (2010, posthumously); Officer's Cross  (2008), Knight's Cross (2004)
Gold Cross of Merit (1999), Silver Cross (1991)
Silver Medal in the Service of the Armed Forces of the Fatherland (1988)
Gold Medal for his contribution to national defense (1998)
Gold Medal Guardian Memorials National (2008)
Badge of Honour "Bene Merito" (2009)
Grand Officer of the Order of Merit (Portugal) (2008)

References 
 Strona DGW

1955 births
2010 deaths
Polish generals
People from Jarosław County
Victims of the Smolensk air disaster
Commanders of the Order of Polonia Restituta
Recipients of the Gold Cross of Merit (Poland)
Grand Officers of the Order of Merit (Portugal)